The Uncommon Reader is a novella by Alan Bennett.  After appearing first in the London Review of Books, Vol. 29, No. 5 (8 March 2007), it was published later the same year in book form by Faber & Faber and Profile Books.

An audiobook version read by the author was released on CD in 2007.

Plot
The title's "uncommon reader" (Queen Elizabeth II) becomes obsessed with books after a chance encounter with a mobile library. The story follows the consequences of this obsession for the Queen, her household and advisers, and her constitutional position.

The title is a play on the phrase "common reader". This can mean a person who reads for pleasure, as opposed to a critic or scholar. It can also mean a set text, a book that everyone in a group (for example, all students entering a university) are expected to read, so that they can have something in common. The Common Reader is used by Virginia Woolf as the title work of her 1925 essay collection. Plus a triple play – Virginia Woolf's title came from Dr. Johnson: "I rejoice to concur with the common reader; for by the common sense of readers, uncorrupted by literary prejudices, after all the refinements of subtilty and the dogmatism of learning, must be generally decided all claims to poetical honours."
  
In British English, "common" holds levels of connotation. A commoner is anyone other than royalty or nobility. Common can also mean vulgar, as common taste; mean, as common thief; ordinary, as common folk; widespread, as in "common use"; or something for use by everyone, as in "common land".

The Queen's reading
Several authors, books, biography subjects, and poems are mentioned in the novella including:
J. R. Ackerley's My Dog Tulip
Lauren Bacall
Anita Brookner
David Cecil
Ivy Compton-Burnett
Jean Genet
Thomas Hardy's "The Convergence of the Twain"
Winifred Holtby
Henry James
Francis Kilvert
Philip Larkin's "The Trees"
Nancy Mitford's The Pursuit of Love and Love in a Cold Climate
Alice Munro
George Painter's biography of Proust
Sylvia Plath
The Brontës
Marcel Proust
Mary Renault
Philip Roth's Portnoy's Complaint
Vikram Seth
Denton Welch
William Shakespeare
Charles Dickens
William Makepeace Thackeray
Jane Austen
George Eliot
E. M. Forster
Laurence Sterne
Kazuo Ishiguro
Ian McEwan
Rose Tremain

References

External links
The Complete Review (with further links)
John Crace's "Digested Read"
The Uncommon Reader publisher's page

British novellas
2007 British novels
Novels by Alan Bennett
Cultural depictions of Elizabeth II
Faber and Faber books
Profile Books books
Books about United Kingdom royalty